Zarni may refer to:

Maung Zarni (born 1963), Burmese educator, academic, and human rights activist
Zarni, Afghanistan
Zarni, Iran, a village in Zanjan Province, Iran
Zarni, New Zealand